Stewart Valley is a village in the Canadian province of Saskatchewan within the Rural Municipality of Saskatchewan Landing No. 167 and Census Division No. 8. It is along the remains of the historic Swift Current-Battleford Trail.

History 
Stewart Valley incorporated as a village on January 1, 1958.

Demographics 

Climate

Notable people
Travis Moen is a Stewart Valley native and a professional ice hockey player most recently playing for the Dallas Stars in the National Hockey League.

Notable events
In late August of 2022, the school and community centre in Stewart Valley burned down.

References

Villages in Saskatchewan
Saskatchewan Landing No. 167
Division No. 8, Saskatchewan